Cassilândia is a municipality located in the Brazilian state of Mato Grosso do Sul. Its population was 22,002 (2020) and its area is 3,650 km².

References
Cassilândia is located in the northeastern part of the state, in the border with Goiás State and is surrounded by beautiful landscapes. It has an international airport and two universities, a private and a state one. The city is known by its famous rodeo party which takes place in late July, early August.

Municipalities in Mato Grosso do Sul